Wu Pass or Wuguan was one of four strategic mountain passes along the southern border of the ancient state of Qin and the north western border of Chu. Wuguan is a modern-day town in Danfeng County, Shaanxi Province.

Popular culture
In Manga Kingdom, Wu Pass was used by Li Mu to try to attack Xianyang. But Lord Biao sensed it and chased them. A siege ensued when Ying Zheng decided to make Zui, the last city on the road to Xianyang, as the last stand, with a surprise if they held the line for a week. Yang Duan He arrives with her army and attacked Zhao's soldiers, the surprise Zheng says.
Years later, Xin and Zui Army used the pass to lift the siege of Xianyang, this time against Lao Ai's army.

See also
Hangu Pass

Mountain passes of China